Sjúrður (or Sigurd), was, around the year 1300, lawman of Shetland and was also possibly lawman of the Faeroe Islands.

Sjúrður was, together with Bishop Erlendur, co-author of the Faeroese Seyðabrævið in 1298 - a document with land use rules for the Faeroe Islands, and the Faeroes' oldest document.

References 

Faroese people of Scottish descent
Lawmen of the Faroe Islands
Year of birth unknown
Year of death unknown